The 2016 Tour Femenino de San Luis is the third edition of a stage race held in the San Luis Province in Argentina, with a UCI rating of 2.1, from 10 January to 15 January. It was the first race of the 2016 Women's Elite cycling calendar and mirrored the men's cycling event, the Tour de San Luis.

Teams

UCI Women's Teams
UnitedHealthcare
Servetto Footon
Team TIBCO-SVB
Weber–Shimano Ladies Power Team 
Alé–Cipollini–Galassia
Xirayas de San Luis
Lares–Waowdeals

Club teams
Cycling Girls Team — Felt
Conade — Visit Mexico
Bontrager—2122
Pedalea C T Colombia
W C T La Plata
Raleigh — Delsanto
Fulvic Soul Cycles
Imperial Cord
Nitrobikes — Venzo
Nova

National teams

Stages

Stage 1
10 January 2015 – El Durazno to El Durazno,

Stage 2
11 January 2015 – Villa Mercedes to Villa Mercedes,

Stage 3
12 January 2015 – Naschel to Merlo,

Stage 4
13 January 2015 – El Durazno,  individual time trial (ITT)

Stage 5
14 January 2015 – Juana Koslay to Mirador del Potrero,

Stage 6
15 January 2015 – San Luis to San Luis,

Jerseys
Source:
 denotes the overall race leader
 denotes the highest placed rider who is under 23 years of age
 denotes the mountain classification leader
 denotes the highest placed Argentinian rider

Classification leadership

References

External links

See also
2016 in women's road cycling

Tour Femenino de San Luis
Cycle races in Argentina
Women's road bicycle races
Tour Femenino de San Luis
Sport in San Luis Province